The 1907 College Football All-America team is composed of various organizations that chose basketball teams that season. The organizations that chose the teams included Collier's Weekly selected by Walter Camp.

All-Americans of 1907

Ends

 Bill Dague, Navy (WC-1; NYT; CR)
 Clarence Alcott, Yale (WC-1; CW-2; NYH; NYP; CF)
 Albert Exendine, Carlisle (College Football Hall of Fame) (WC-2; CW-1; NYW; CR)
 Caspar Wister, Princeton (WC-3; CW-1; NYH; NYT; NYW; NYP, AFR)
 Hunter Scarlett, Penn (WC-2; FY-1)
 James Fox Macdonald, Harvard (WC-3; CW-2)
 Bob Blake, Vanderbilt (FY-1, AFR)
 Charles H. Watson, Cornell (CF)

Tackles
 Dexter Draper, Penn (WC-1; CW-1; NYH; NYT; CR)
 Lucius Horatio Biglow, Yale (WC-1; CW-1; NYT; NYW; NYP; FY-1; CF; CR [g], AFR)
 Bill Horr, Syracuse (WC-2; NYH)
 Bernard O'Rourke, Cornell (WC-2; CW-2; NYP; CF)
 Henry J. Weeks, Army (WC-3; CW-2)
 Benjamin Lang, Dartmouth (WC-3)
 Walter Rheinschild, Michigan (FY-1)
 Daniel Pullen, Army (NYW)
 Edwin J. Donnelly, Trinity (CR)

Guards
 Gus Ziegler, Penn (WC-1; CW-1; NYH; NYT; CF; CR, AFR)
 William Erwin, Army (WC-1; CW-1; NYT; FY-1; CF)
 Edward Rich, Dartmouth (WC-2)
 Elmer Thompson, Cornell (WC-2; CW-2; NYH; NYW; NYP; FY-1, AFR)
 Francis Burr, Harvard (CW-2; NYP, AFR [as T])
 William Goebel, Yale (WC-3)
 Walter Kreider, Swarthmore (WC-3)

Centers

 Germany Schulz, Michigan (College Football Hall of Fame) (WC-1; CW-2; FY-1; CF)
 Patrick Grant, Harvard (WC-2; CW-1; NYW; NYP; CR)
 W. J. Phillips, Princeton (WC-3; NYH)
 Frank Slingluff, Jr., Navy (NYT)
 Stein Stone, Vanderbilt (AFR)

Quarterbacks
 Tad Jones, Yale (WC-1; CW-1; NYH; NYT; NYW; NYP; CF)
 Edward Dillon, Princeton (WC-2; CW-2; FY-1; CR)
 Walter Steffen, Chicago (College Football Hall of Fame) (WC-3)
 Frank Mount Pleasant, Carlisle (AFR)

Halfbacks
 Jack Wendell, Harvard (WC-1; CW-1; NYH; FY-1; CF; CR)
 Edwin Harlan, Princeton (WC-1; NYT; NYW; NYP; FY-1, AFR)
 John L. Marks, Dartmouth (WC-2)
 A. H. Douglas, Navy (WC-3 [fb]; CW-2; NYT; CF)
 Bob Folwell, Penn (NYP; CR)
 George Capron, Minnesota (WC-3)
 Edward L. McCallie, Cornell (NYW)
 John Glaze, Dartmouth (AFR)

Fullbacks
 Ted Coy, Yale (College Football Hall of Fame) (WC-2; CW-1 [hb]; NYH; NYP; FY-1; CF, CR, AFR)
 Jim McCormick, Princeton (WC-1; CW-2; NYT; NYW)
 Peter Hauser, Carlisle (WC-3 [hb]; CW-1; NYH [hb])
 Bill Hollenback, Penn (College Football Hall of Fame) (WC-2; CW-2)

Key
NCAA recognized selectors for 1907
 WC = Collier's Weekly as selected by Walter Camp
 CW = Caspar Whitney

Other selectors
 NYH = New York Herald
 NYT = New York Tribune
 NYW = New York World (Robert Edgren)
 NYP = New York Press
 FY = Fielding H. Yost, football coach of the University of Michigan, for the North American Press Syndicate.
 CF = Carl Flanders
 CR = Constant Reader
 AFR = Abilene Semi Weekly Farm Reporter. "selected not according to their weight, but their conception of the new game"

Bold = Consensus All-American
 1 – First-team selection
 2 – Second-team selection
 3 – Third-team selection

See also
 1907 All-Southern college football team
 1907 All-Western college football team

References

All-America Team
College Football All-America Teams